The Type 8 and later Type 9 were automobiles designed by Ettore Bugatti for the Deutz Gasmotoren Fabrik in 1907.  These used long-stroke four-cylinder engines.

See also
 Bugatti

8